The 2014 TAC Cup season was the 23rd season of the TAC Cup competition. Oakleigh Chargers have won the season to claim the club's third premiership win after defeating the Calder Cannons in the grand final by 47 points.

Ladder

Grand Final

References

NAB League
Nab League